Jorge Hernán Bermúdez Morales (born 18 June 1971) is a retired Colombian football defender. He played 56 times for the Colombia national team between 1995 and 2001.

Playing career
Bermúdez played at the club level for several teams in Colombia including Deportes Quindío, América de Cali, Deportivo Quevedo, Deportivo Pereira and Independiente Santa Fe. He started his career with Deportes Quindio which was also the team he finished his career with 17 years later.

Bermúdez also played for a number of clubs outside Colombia including Benfica (Portugal), Boca Juniors (Argentina), Olympiakos Pireus (Greece), Newell's Old Boys (Argentina) and Barcelona Guayaquil (Ecuador).

During his time with Boca Juniors he won a number of major titles including the Copa Libertadores and Copa Intercontinental in 2000 and three league titles (Ap 1998,
Cl 1999 & Ap 2000).

He was a participant at the 1992 Summer Olympics and went on to play 56 times for the full international squad including appearances at the 1998 FIFA World Cup and in three editions of the Copa América in 1995, 1997 and 1999.

Later and coaching career
After retiring, Bermúdez managed Depor Jamundí, Deportivo Pasto and América de Cali.

In September 2010, Bermúdez was appointed manager of the Argentine 2nd division side Defensa y Justicia. He left the position on 23 November 2010 after five defeats and two draws.

Bermúdez worked as a TV-pundit and commentator at ESPN for a few years, before he was appointed sporting director of Atlético Huila on 6 December 2016. On 22 May 2017, Bermúdez was appointed caretaker manager of Atlético Huila after the coach was fired. He left Huile in June 2017.

In December 2019, Bermúdez was back in football, when he was appointed as a member of Boca Juniors Soccer Council, led by newly appointed vice-president Juan Román Riquelme.

Club statistics

Source:

International goals

References

External links
 Argentine Primera statistics at Fútbol XXI  
 

1971 births
Living people
Association football defenders
Colombian footballers
Colombia international footballers
Colombia under-20 international footballers
1998 FIFA World Cup players
1995 Copa América players
Olympic footballers of Colombia
Footballers at the 1992 Summer Olympics
América de Cali footballers
Independiente Santa Fe footballers
Deportes Quindío footballers
Deportivo Pereira footballers
S.L. Benfica footballers
Boca Juniors footballers
Newell's Old Boys footballers
Colombian expatriate sportspeople in Argentina
Colombian expatriate footballers
Expatriate footballers in Argentina
Expatriate footballers in Greece
Expatriate footballers in Ecuador
Expatriate footballers in Portugal
Colombian expatriate sportspeople in Portugal
Olympiacos F.C. players
Barcelona S.C. footballers
Categoría Primera A players
Argentine Primera División players
Primeira Liga players
Super League Greece players
Ecuadorian Serie A players
Colombian football managers
Expatriate football managers in Argentina
Defensa y Justicia managers
C.D. Quevedo footballers
People from Quindío Department
Deportivo Pasto managers